Vidya Sinha (15 November 1947 – 15 August 2019) was an Indian actress who acted in Hindi films, most known for Rajnigandha (1974), Chhoti Si Baat (1975) and Pati Patni Aur Woh (1978). She started her career as a model and won the Miss Bombay title. Her first movie was Raja Kaka (1974) opposite Kiran Kumar. However, fame came to her through the low-budget break-away hit Rajnigandha (1974), directed by her mentor Basu Chatterjee. She acted in several films after which she took a hiatus. Returning to acting in the later part of her life, she acted in several TV serials and the Salman Khan movie Bodyguard (2011).

Early life 
Vidya Sinha was born on 15 November 1947 in Mumbai. Her father Pratap A. Rana (film name), also known as Rana Pratap Singh, was an Indian film producer, son-in-law of film director Mohan Sinha.

Career

Movies 
At the age of 18, she participated in a beauty contest where she was crowned Miss Bombay. After that she began modelling for several popular brands and was discovered by Basu Chatterjee. Her first movie was Raja Kaka (1974) opposite Kiran Kumar. However, fame came to her through the low-budget break-away hit Rajnigandha (1974), directed by Chatterjee. The movie, with none of the trappings of a typical blockbuster, was a major box office success. This was followed by another hit, Chhoti Si Baat (1975), paving the way for starring in mainstream productions with bigger budgets – Karm (1977) with Rajesh Khanna and Shabana Azmi, Mukti (1977) with Sanjeev Kumar and Shashi Kapoor, Inkaar (1977) with Vinod Khanna, Pati Patni Aur Woh (1978) with Sanjeev Kumar and Ranjeeta Kaur, Gulzar's Kitaab (1977) and Meera (1979). Vidya acted in 30 movies over a period of 10 years. In the Raj Sippy directed Josh (1981), she played her only negative role; that of a gangster stealing coins from beggars. The same year she played Vijeta Pandit's mother in the romantic film Love Story, starring opposite Rajendra Kumar and Danny.

After some years in Australia, Vidya returned to India and started acting in television serials. Salman Khan's Bodyguard (2011), her film after 25 years, was also her last film.

Television 
Vidya Sinha acted in TV serials like Bahu Rani (2000), Hum Do Hain Na, Bhabhi and Kkavyanjali (2004). In 2011 she appeared in the NDTV Imagine serial Haar Jeet. She enacted the role of Asad's and Ayaan's grandmother, Badi Bi in the Zee TV show, Qubool Hai.  She was also seen as Neha's grandmother in Itti Si Khushi., as Chandragupt's grandmother in Chandra Nandini and as Kulfi's grandmother in Kullfi Kumarr Bajewala.

Filmography

Television

Personal life 
Sinha married her neighbor, a Tamil Brahmin named Venkateshwaran Iyer, in 1968 and adopted a daughter, Jhanvi, in 1989.  The next few years were spent in taking care of Jhanvi and her ailing husband, who eventually died in 1996. She then moved to Sydney, met the elderly Australian doctor, Netaji Bhimrao Salunke, online in 2001, and married him after a quick courtship, in a small temple wedding. On 9 January 2009, she filed a complaint with the police accusing Salunkhe of physical and mental torture. They were divorced soon afterwards, and after a protracted battle, she won her case against him for maintenance.

Death 
On 15 August 2019, Sinha died at a hospital in Mumbai of respiratory failure caused by heart and lung disease at the age of 71. She had been admitted to the hospital on 11 August for breathing problems and subsequently put on a ventilator.

References

External links 
 
 
 Archived pictures of Vidya Sinha at The Indian Express

Actresses from Mumbai
Indian film actresses
1947 births
2019 deaths
Actresses in Hindi cinema
Actresses in Hindi television
Indian television actresses
20th-century Indian actresses
21st-century Indian actresses
Actors from Mumbai
Deaths from respiratory failure